Major General Roscoe Barnett Woodruff (February 9, 1891 – April 24, 1975) was a career United States Army officer who fought in both World War I and World War II and served for 38 years. During World War II he commanded numerous divisions and corps in Europe and the Pacific.

Early life

Woodruff was born on February 9, 1891, in Oskaloosa, Iowa, the son of Rhoda Barnett Woodruff and Calvin Woodruff, an army officer. After attending numerous public schools and the Iowa State University, in 1911, aged 20, he entered the United States Military Academy (USMA). He was the First Captain of the Corps of Cadets and, on June 12, 1915, he graduated from the USMA as part of the West Point class of 1915, often referred to as "the class the stars fell on". Subsequently he was commissioned as a second lieutenant into the Infantry Branch of the United States Army. Among those he graduated with were Dwight D. Eisenhower, Omar Bradley, James Van Fleet, Stafford LeRoy Irwin, Henry J. F. Miller, John Stewart Bragdon, Charles W. Ryder, Joseph May Swing, Ralph P. Cousins, Charles W. Ryder, Paul J. Mueller, Luis R. Esteves, Vernon Evans, Leland Hobbs, John B. Wogan, and Vernon Prichard. All of these men would, like Woodruff, become general officers in the future.

Military career
After graduation, he served on the Mexican border. After the American entry into World War I, which occurred in April 1917, Woodruff, as a young captain, became a company commander in command of Company 'H' of the 2nd Battalion, 9th Infantry Regiment, part of the 2nd Infantry Division. Woodruff was among the first of his West Point classmates to enter combat in World War I in the fall of 1917, when the division was sent to the Western Front as one of the first units of the American Expeditionary Force (AEF). This combat experience during 1917–1918 served Woodruff in good stead in his later command and staff assignments during the final stages of the war and in the post-war operations. The war came to an end on November 11, 1918.

Between the wars
During the interwar period Woodruff remained in the army and attended various service schools. He attended the U.S. Army Command and General Staff School in the mid-1920s, graduating from there as an honor graduate in 1927. He then became an instructor there from 1927–1931. In 1931 he attended the U.S. Army War College. He was then was a tactical officer at the USMA from 1932–1936. On July 1, 1936, he was promoted to lieutenant colonel. In 1938, Woodruff served in the General Staff of the War Department in the operations and tactics section.

World War II
As a lieutenant colonel, he commanded the 2nd Battalion, 23rd Infantry Regiment. After being promoted to the temporary rank of colonel on June 26, 1941 he then commanded the regiment, then stationed at Fort Sam Houston, Texas, from July 1941 to January 1942. His fellow West Point classmate, Lieutenant Colonel Dwight Eisenhower, also arrived there as the newly appointed chief of staff of the Third Army in June 1941. Both men were at Fort Sam Houston during the Japanese attack on Pearl Harbor on December 7, 1941. The German declaration of war on the United States followed just four days later, which brought the United States into World War II.

With the United States now at war, Woodruff was promoted to the one-star general officer rank of brigadier general on January 15, 1942 and in March 1942, became the assistant division commander (ADC) of the 77th Infantry Division, a unit of the Organized Reserves which had been recently called up for active duty. The division was composed almost entirely of conscripts (or "draftees"). From June 1942 to May 1943, Woodruff, recently promoted to the temporary two-star rank of major general, took full command of the division during its pre-deployment training in Fort Jackson, South Carolina, prior to its assignment to the Pacific Theater in the spring of 1944.

In May 1943, he relinquished command of the 77th Division to Major General Andrew D. Bruce and took command of VII Corps, then stationed in England. Eisenhower, now a four-star general and the Supreme Allied Commander in Europe, initially selected Woodruff as one of three corps commanders, along with Major General Leonard T. Gerow, commanding V Corps, and Major General Willis D. Crittenberger, commanding XIX Corps, for the Allied invasion of Normandy, which was then scheduled for May 1944. All three were well known and trusted by the Supreme Allied Commander.

When Woodruff's West Point classmate and fellow infantryman, Lieutenant General Omar Bradley, who had just arrived in England from serving in the Mediterranean Theater of Operations (MTO), was selected to command the U.S. First Army for the upcoming Normandy invasion in October 1943, Bradley's concern was that his three corps commanders all lacked experience in amphibious operations or combat command. Neither Woodruff nor Gerow had fought in World War II and Crittenberger did not fight in either of the World Wars. Gerow, who was close to Eisenhower and a protégé of General George C. Marshall, Jr., the U.S. Army Chief of Staff, was retained, but Crittenberger moved to command of IV Corps on the Italian Front, and Woodruff was shuffled off to command of XIX Corps, Crittenberger's former command, for several weeks, before returning to the United States, and he handed over command of XIX Corps to Major General Charles H. Corlett. Upon his return to the United States, Woodruff assumed command the 84th Infantry Division, then in training at Camp Claiborne, Louisiana, from March to June 1944. Taking over the command of VII Corps was Major General J. Lawton Collins, who had commanded the 25th Infantry Division with distinction in the Pacific.

In November 1944, Woodruff's chance at large-scale combat command finally came as commanding general (CG) of the 24th Infantry Division in the Southwest Pacific. His welcoming reception in the theater was celebrated at the paratroop headquarters, fueled with five gallons of torpedo alcohol, furnished by U.S. Navy patrol boat sailors, as the key ingredient for liquid refreshments. He led his command in the five month Battle of Mindanao to liberate that island of Philippine archipelago from Japanese occupation in the closing phases of the Leyte campaign.

Postwar
In November 1945, after World War II had come to an end due to the surrender of both the Germans and the Japanese, Woodruff became commander of the I Corps, part of the U.S. Eighth Army, during the Allied occupation force in southern Japan.

From February 1948 to March 1951, Woodruff was deputy commanding general of the U.S. First Army at Fort Jay, Governors Island, New York. Woodruff assumed the role of Commanding General (CG) from January to March 1949 upon the retirement of General Courtney Hodges, who had commanded the First Army during World War II, and again from October to November 1950 after General Walter Bedell Smith was appointed the Director of the Central Intelligence Agency (CIA).

In 1951, Woodruff took command of XV Corps at Camp Polk (now Fort Polk), Louisiana. There he retired from the army, as a major general, in January 1953 after 41 years of active duty.

Retirement and later life
Woodruff and his wife, Alice Gray Woodruff retired to San Antonio, Texas. Woodruff died on July 24, 1975, aged 84. He was buried in the Fort Sam Houston National Cemetery.

Awards and decorations
  Distinguished Service Medal with Oak Leaf Cluster
  Silver Star with two Oak Leaf Clusters
  Bronze Star with Oak Leaf Cluster
  Air Medal with Oak Leaf Cluster
  Army Commendation Medal
  Purple Heart
  World War I Victory Medal
  World War II Victory Medal
  Mexican Border Service Medal
  American Defense Service Medal
  American Campaign Medal
  European–African–Middle Eastern Campaign Medal
  Army of Occupation Medal

References

Bibliography

External links

 I Corps – A Brief History 1862–1953
  Marines in World War II Commemorative Series. Securing the Surrender: Marines in the Occupation of Japan  by Charles R. Smith
 The Army Almanac: A Book of Facts Concerning the Army of the United States, U.S. Government Printing Office, 1950 Combat Chronicle- 84th Infantry Division
 History of the 23rd Regiment in World War II
Roscoe B. Woodruff Manuscript of The World War II of Major General Roscoe B. Woodruff, Dwight D. Eisenhower Presidential Library
Generals of World War II
United States Army Officers 1939–1945

|-

|-

|-

|-

|-

|-

|-

1891 births
1975 deaths
United States Military Academy alumni
United States Army generals
United States Army personnel of World War I
United States Army Infantry Branch personnel
Recipients of the Distinguished Service Medal (US Army)
Recipients of the Legion of Merit
Recipients of the Silver Star
People from Oskaloosa, Iowa
Burials at Fort Sam Houston National Cemetery
Recipients of the Air Medal
Graduates of the United States Military Academy Class of 1915
United States Army generals of World War II
United States Army War College alumni
United States Army Command and General Staff College alumni
United States Army Command and General Staff College faculty
Military personnel from Iowa